The following are the national records in athletics in Cape Verde maintained by Cape Verde's national athletics federation: Federação Caboverdiana de Atletismo (FCA).

Outdoor

Key to tables:

h = hand timing

# = not ratified by federation

NWI = no wind information

Men

Women

Indoor

Men

Women

Notes

References
General
World Athletics Statistic Handbook 2019: National Outdoor Records
World Athletics Statistic Handbook 2018: National Indoor Records
Specific

External links
 FCA official website

Cape Verde
Records
Athletics